HeartRhythm Case Reports (HRCR) is an online-only, open access medical journal that publishes case reports, images, and educational articles in the field of cardiac arrhythmias and electrophysiology. HRCR is the second peer-reviewed journal from the Heart Rhythm Society and is published by Elsevier.

Journal Scope 
HRCR focuses on all aspects of cardiac rhythm management with an emphasis on education.   Articles describe the diagnosis and treatment of heart rhythm disorders and the electrophysiology of the heart and blood vessels.  Sections of the journal include: Case Reports, Clinical Problem Solving, Images, Electrocardiogram Unknowns, Letters to the Editor, and an Allied Health Professional Section.

History 
The first issue of HRCR was published in January 2015 with T. Jared Bunch, MD, FHRS, as the founding editor in chief. Initially, the journal published an issue every other month but in 2017 switched to monthly publication.

Abstracting and indexing 
The journal is abstracted and indexed in Scopus and PubMed Central.

References

External links 

 Official Website

Cardiology journals
Case report journals
Open access journals
English-language journals
Publications established in 2015
Elsevier academic journals